Dargan Bridge, built in the 1990s, is a railway bridge in Belfast, Northern Ireland. This bridge spans the River Lagan and connects the railway lines to Larne and Derry (via Bleach Green) to those east Bangor and south to Newry and the Republic. It runs mostly parallel to the Lagan Bridge (opened 1995) carrying the M3 motorway across the Lagan. One of the first people to cross it was Mr John Johnston, the first Station Manager of Belfast Central Station and his grandson James Currie. 

The name commemorates William Dargan, who was involved in bringing railways to many parts of Ireland.

Limitations
The bridge was built during a period of declining rail traffic so it was constructed to consist of single track with a passing loop in the centre. This limits the number of trains that can use it to 24 per hour.

Gallery

See also
List of bridges over the River Lagan

References

Railway bridges in Northern Ireland
Buildings and structures in Belfast
Bridges in Northern Ireland